Pierrot Vervroegen (born in Belgium) was a Belgian Grand Prix motorcycle road racer. He was a regular front runner in the Belgian motorcycle Championships and won the national 250cc title in 1959 riding a MOTOBI Catria Sport.
In 1961 he won the first round of the FIM's 50cc Coupe d'Europe riding an Itom. He entered four world championship Grand Prix's in 1955, 1960, 1961 and 1962, and gained a single World Championship point in the 1962 250cc World Championship.

References

125cc World Championship riders
250cc World Championship riders
Belgian motorcycle racers
Living people
Year of birth missing (living people)